Wilfrid Stalker Sellars (May 20, 1912 – July 2, 1989) was an American philosopher and prominent developer of critical realism, who "revolutionized both the content and the method of philosophy in the United States".

Life and career
His father was the Canadian-American philosopher Roy Wood Sellars, a leading American philosophical naturalist in the first half of the twentieth-century. Wilfrid was educated at the University of Michigan (BA, 1933), the University at Buffalo, and Oriel College, Oxford (1934–1937), where he was a Rhodes Scholar, obtaining his highest earned degree, an MA, in 1940. During World War II, he served in military intelligence. He then taught at the University of Iowa (1938–1946), the University of Minnesota (1947–1958), Yale University (1958–1963), and from 1963 until his death, at the University of Pittsburgh. He served as president of the Metaphysical Society of America in 1977. He was a founder of the journal Philosophical Studies.

Sellars is well known as a critic of foundationalist epistemology—the "Myth of the Given" as he called it. However, his philosophical works are more generally directed toward the ultimate goal of reconciling intuitive ways of describing the world (both those of common sense and traditional philosophy) with a thoroughly naturalist, scientific account of reality. He is widely regarded both for great sophistication of argument and for his assimilation of many and diverse subjects in pursuit of a synoptic vision. Sellars was perhaps the first philosopher to synthesize elements of American pragmatism with elements of British and American analytic philosophy and Austrian and German logical positivism. His work also reflects a sustained engagement with the German tradition of transcendental idealism, most obviously in his book Science and Metaphysics: Kantian Variations.

Philosophical work
Sellars coined certain now-common idioms in philosophy, such as the "space of reasons". This idiom refers to two things. It:
 Describes the conceptual and behavioral web of language that humans use to get intelligently around their world,
 Denotes the fact that talk of reasons, epistemic justification, and intention is not the same as, and cannot necessarily be mapped onto, talk of causes and effects in the sense that physical science speaks of them.
Note: (2) corresponds in part to the distinction Sellars makes between the manifest image and the scientific image.

"Empiricism and the Philosophy of Mind"

Sellars's most famous work is "Empiricism and the Philosophy of Mind" (1956). In it, he criticizes the view that knowledge of what we perceive can be independent of the conceptual processes which result in perception. He named this "The Myth of the Given," attributing it to sense-data theories of knowledge.

The work targets several theories at once, especially C. I. Lewis' Kantian pragmatism and Rudolf Carnap's positivism. He draws out "The Myth of Jones," to defend the possibility of a strict behaviorist world-view. The parable explains how thoughts, intelligent action, and even subjective inner experience can be attributed to people within a scientific model. Sellars used a fictional tribe, the "Ryleans," since he wanted to address Gilbert Ryle's The Concept of Mind.

Sellars's idea of "myth", heavily influenced by Ernst Cassirer, is not necessarily negative. He saw it as something that can be useful or otherwise, rather than true or false. He aimed to unite the conceptual behavior of the "space of reasons" with the concept of a subjective sense experience. This was one of his most central goals, which his later work described as Kantian.

"The Language of Theories"
In his paper "The Language of Theories“ (1961), Sellars introduces the concept of Kantian empiricism. Kantian empiricism features a distinction between (1) claims whose revision requires abandonment or modification of the system of concepts in terms of which they are framed (i.e., modification of the fallible set of constitutive principles underlying knowledge, otherwise known as framework-relative a priori truths) and (2) claims revisable on the basis of observations formulated in terms of a system of concepts which remained fixed throughout.

"Philosophy and the Scientific Image of Man"
In his "Philosophy and the Scientific Image of Man" (1962), Sellars distinguishes between the "manifest image" and the "scientific image" of the world.

The manifest image includes intentions, thoughts, and appearances. Sellars allows that the manifest image may be refined through 'correlational induction', but he rules out appeal to imperceptible entities.

The scientific image describes the world in terms of the theoretical physical sciences. It includes notions such as causality and theories about particles and forces.

The two images sometimes complement one another, and sometimes conflict. For example, the manifest image includes practical or moral claims, whereas the scientific image does not. There is conflict, e.g. where science tells us that apparently solid objects are mostly empty space. Sellars favours a synoptic vision, wherein the scientific image takes ultimate precedence in cases of conflict, at least with respect to empirical descriptions and explanations.

Politics
Sellars was involved in left-wing politics. As a student at the University of Michigan, Wilfrid Sellars was one of the founding members of the first North-American cooperative house for university students, which was then called "Michigan Socialist House" (and which was later renamed "Michigan Cooperative House"). He also campaigned for the socialist candidate Norman Thomas of the Socialist Party of America.

Legacy
Robert Brandom, his junior colleague at Pittsburgh, named Sellars and Willard Van Orman Quine as the two most profound and important philosophers of their generation. Sellars's goal of a synoptic philosophy that unites the everyday and scientific views of reality is the foundation and archetype of what is sometimes called the Pittsburgh School, whose members include Brandom, John McDowell, and John Haugeland. Especially Brandom introduced a Hegelian variety of the Pittsburgh School, often called analytic Hegelianism.

Other philosophers strongly influenced by Sellars span the full spectrum of contemporary English-speaking philosophy, from neopragmatism (Richard Rorty) to eliminative materialism (Paul Churchland) to rationalism (Laurence BonJour). Sellars's philosophical heirs also include Ruth Millikan, Héctor-Neri Castañeda, Bruce Aune, Jay Rosenberg, Johanna Seibt, Matthew Burstein, Ray Brassier, Andrew Chrucky, Jeffrey Sicha, Pedro Amaral, Thomas Vinci, Willem A. de Vries, David Rosenthal, Ken Wilber and Michael Williams. Sellars's work has been drawn upon in feminist standpoint theory, for example in the work of Quill Kukla.

Sellars's death in 1989 was the result of long-term alcohol use. A collection of essays devoted to 'Sellars and his Legacy' was published by Oxford University Press in 2016 (James O'Shea, ed., Wilfrid Sellars and his Legacy), with contributions from Brandom, deVries, Kraut, Kukla, Lance, McDowell, Millikan, O'Shea, Rosenthal, Seibt, and Williams.

Bibliography
 Pure Pragmatics and Possible Worlds-The Early Essays of Wilfrid Sellars, [PPPW], ed. by Jeffrey F. Sicha, (Ridgeview Publishing Co; Atascadero, CA; 1980). [Contains a long introductory essay by Sicha and an extensive bibliography of Sellars's work through 1979.]
 Science, Perception and Reality, [SPR], (Routledge & Kegan Paul Ltd; London, and The Humanities Press: New York; 1963) [Reissued in 1991 by Ridgeview Publishing Co., Atascadero, CA. This edition contains a complete bibliography of Sellars's published work through 1989.]
 Philosophical Perspectives, [PP], (Charles C. Thomas: Springfield, IL; 1967). Reprinted in two volumes, Philosophical Perspectives: History of Philosophy and Philosophical Perspective: Metaphysics and Epistemology, (Ridgeview Publishing Co.; Atascadero, CA; 1977).
 Science and Metaphysics: Variations on Kantian Themes. [S&M], (Routledge & Kegan Paul Ltd; London, and The Humanities Press; New York; 1968). The 1966 John Locke Lectures. [Reissued in 1992 by Ridgeview Publishing Co., Atascadero, CA. This edition contains a complete bibliography of Sellars's published work through 1989, a register of Sellars's philosophical correspondence, and a listing of circulated but unpublished papers and lectures.]
 Essays in Philosophy and Its History, [EPH], (D. Reidel Publishing Co.; Dordrecht, Holland; 1975).
 Naturalism and Ontology, [N&O], (Ridgeview Publishing Co.; Atascadero, CA: 1979). [An expanded version of the 1974 John Dewey Lectures]
 The Metaphysics of Epistemology: Lectures by Wilfrid Sellars, edited by Pedro Amaral, (Ridgeview Publishing Co.; Atascadero, CA; 1989). [Contains a complete bibliography of Sellars's published work through 1989.]
 Empiricism and the Philosophy of Mind [EPM*], edited by Robert Brandom, (Harvard University Press.; Cambridge, Massachusetts; 1997). [The original, 1956, version of [EPM] (see below), lacking footnotes added in [SPR], with an Introduction by Richard Rorty and Study Guide by Brandom.]
 Kant and Pre-Kantian Themes: Lectures by Wilfrid Sellars, edited by Pedro Amaral, (Ridgeview Publishing Co.; Atascadero, CA: 2002). [A transcription of Sellars's Kant lectures, plus essays on Descartes, Locke, Spinoza, and Leibniz.]
 Kant's Transcendental Metaphysics: Cassirer Lecture Notes and Other Essays, edited by Jeffrey F. Sicha, (Ridgeview Publishing Co.; Atascadero, CA: 2002). [Contains a complete bibliography of Sellars's published work, philosophical correspondence, and circulated manuscripts through 2002.]

See also
 American philosophy
 Definitions of philosophy
 List of American philosophers
 The Myth of the Framework
 Transcendental empiricism

References

Further reading
McDowell, John. Mind and World. Cambridge, Massachusetts: Harvard University Press, 1996.
Rorty, Richard. Philosophy and the Mirror of Nature. Princeton, New Jersey: Princeton University Press, 1979.

External links
 Stanford Encyclopedia of Philosophy: Wilfrid Sellars – Willem deVries.
 
 Wilfrid Sellars web site. Includes complete bibliography of his writings, some readable online, and a list of the Ph.Ds he supervised.
 Autobiographical Reflections.
 Dictionary of the Philosophy of Mind – Wilfrid Sellars – Article by Christopher Gauker on Sellars's contributions to the philosophy of mind.
 Finding Aid for the Wilfrid S. Sellars Archive at the University of Pittsburgh
  Notre Dame Lectures 1969-1986 – Transcribed from recordings by Sellars's student Pedro Amaral.
  The Wilfrid Sellars Society – Homepage of the Wilfrid Sellars Society.
 Wilfrid Sellars  L'immagine scientifica e l'immagine manifesta a cura di: Carlo Marletti, Giacomo Turbanti, Edizioni ETS 2013
 Wilfrid S. Sellars Papers (Wilfrid S. Sellars Papers, 1899–1990, ASP.1991.01, Archives of Scientific Philosophy, Special Collections Department, University of Pittsburgh.)

1912 births
1989 deaths
20th-century American philosophers
University of Pittsburgh faculty
American people of Canadian descent
Analytic philosophers
Kantian philosophers
Pragmatists
Sellers, Wilfrid
Presidents of the Metaphysical Society of America
Epistemologists
University of Michigan alumni
20th-century  American historians
People from Ann Arbor, Michigan
University at Buffalo alumni